The Spartan Cruiser was a 1930s British three-engined transport monoplane for 6 to 10 passengers built by Spartan Aircraft Limited at East Cowes, Isle of Wight.
It was a development of the Saro-Percival Mailplane for passenger use.

Design and development
The Saro-Percival Mailplane was a three-engined monoplane mail plane designed by Edgar Percival, and built by Saunders-Roe Limited (Saro) at Cowes in 1931, the aircraft first flying early in 1932.  It was a low-winged monoplane, with a wooden wing and plywood fuselage, and was powered by three 120 hp de Havilland Gipsy III engines. When Saro was financially re-organised, Percival sold his interest in the aircraft to Saro, who re-designated it as the Saro A.24 Mailplane. Due to the close ties between Saro and Spartan Aircraft, the development of the aircraft was transferred to Spartan, and the aircraft was re-designated again as the Spartan Mailplane. The aircraft was modified to accommodate two passenger seats. Starting on 15 June 1932, the Mailplane (G-ABLI) flew from Stanley Park Aerodrome (Blackpool) to Karachi, India taking a total of 5 days 23 hours 50 minutes.

The Mailplane had seen no commercial interest, so the design was re-worked as a passenger carrier. This re-designed aircraft was designated the Spartan Cruiser, and the prototype (G-ABTY) first flew in May 1932, piloted by Louis Strange. The original three-engined low-wing format had been retained, but the plywood fuselage was replaced with an all-metal fuselage to carry six passengers and two crew.

Just one example was built of the basic Cruiser (G-ABTY, later known as the Cruiser I). Both the new Cruiser and the Mailplane were displayed at the first Society of British Aircraft Constructors (SBAC) Show at Hendon Aerodrome on 27 June 1932. It was then used for demonstrations, including a 3,593-mile European sales tour. The Yugoslavia airline Aeroput ordered two aircraft and a licence to build further examples in Yugoslavia at the Zmaj aircraft factory.

The Cruiser was re-designed as the Spartan Cruiser II, featuring a modified fuselage and cockpit. The first Cruiser II (G-ACBM) flew in February 1933, powered by Cirrus Hermes IV engines, and G-ACKG/VT-AER also used that engine type. Most Spartan-built Cruiser IIs were powered by three Gipsy Major engines, but G-ACOU/OK-ATM was powered by Walter Major engines. In 1933 and 1934, twelve Cruiser IIs were built by Spartan, five of which were exported. Just one licence-built Cruiser II (YU-SAP) was built in Zemun, Yugoslavia, by Zmaj Aircraft, in 1935.

One further development was the Spartan Cruiser III, with an aerodynamically-refined fuselage accommodating eight passengers, a modified windscreen and a trousered main undercarriage. Only three Cruiser IIIs were built (G-ACYK, G-ADEL and G-ADEM), for Spartan Air Lines.

Operational history
Spartan Air Lines Ltd was formed to operate Cruisers between London and Cowes, Isle of Wight. In April 1933, Spartan Air Lines initially operated the one Cruiser I (G-ABTY) and two Cruiser IIs (G-ACDW and G-ACDX) from Heston Aerodrome. Iraq Airwork Limited ordered one aircraft for an experimental air route between Baghdad and Mosul, with a further aircraft being ordered by Misr Airwork, the Egyptian branch of Airwork. Two Cruiser IIs and one Cruiser III were impressed into RAF service in 1940.

Operators

Civil operators

Bata Shoe Company

Misr Airwork Limited

Maharajah of Patiala

Iraq Airwork Limited

Aeroput

British Airways Limited (1936-1940)
Northern and Scottish Airways (1936)
Railway Air Services (1936)
Scottish Airways (1936-1938)
Spartan Air Lines (1933-1935)
United Airways (1934)

Military operators

Royal Yugoslav Air Force - Two aircraft impressed into military service in 1940.

Royal Air Force

Surviving aircraft
The fuselage of a Cruiser III (G-ACYK) is on display at the National Museum of Flight, East Fortune, Scotland. This aircraft crashed in 1938; in 1973, the cabin section was moved by helicopter from the crash site near Largs to the museum.

Specifications (Cruiser II)

See also

Notes

References

External links

Spartan Cruiser
Spartan Cruiser II Scheme
Spartan Cruiser II YI-AAA
Spartan Cruiser II G-ACSM
Image of Cruiser III registration G-ACYK
Isle of Wight Aviation - Simmonds-Spartan Aircraft Production List & Photos

Cruiser
Low-wing aircraft
1930s British airliners
Trimotors
Aircraft first flown in 1932